Frederick G. Zinsser (March 21, 1868 – January 20, 1956) was a resident of Hastings-on-Hudson, New York who established a chemical plant on the waterfront of the Hudson River called Zinsser & Company, which synthesized organic chemicals. The Zinsser plant was as one of the establishments contracted to produce mustard gas during the First World War.

Zinsser was born in New York City to German immigrants parents. His brother was Hans Zinsser, the celebrated bacteriologist at Columbia and Harvard who became best known for authoring the best-selling book Rats, Lice and History in 1935. Zinsser completed a degree in chemistry at Columbia University, and then further studied at Louvain University in Belgium, and Göttingen University and Heidelberg University in Germany, where he received a Ph.D. in 1891. At Heidelberg University he worked three years under Viktor Meyer, who first synthesized mustard gas in 1886. In 1897 he established Zinsser & Company, Inc., whose president and chief chemist he was, and enter the emerging field of synthetic organic chemicals. The first product was called "Hastings Spirits", a refined wood alcohol or methanol.

He married Emma Sharman, and they had three children, they raised them in a well-to-do German-speaking household. (The son John attended Harvard University, and was a chemist and associated with his father for some years, then later became vice chairman of the board of Merck & Co. of Rahway, New Jersey and president of Sharp & Dohme Inc. of Philadelphia and was on the board of directors of the investment bank JP Morgan in New York during the 1940s. The two daughters Ellen and Margaret ("Peggy") both attended Smith College and were sent to Germany to complete their education. "Peggy" married Lewis Williams Douglas, scion of one of the most powerful families in Arizona and sole heir of the Phelps Dodge copper mining fortune, who succeeded Harriman as ambassador to London. Ellen married John J. McCloy, the chief lawyer for the Rockefeller and the "Seven Sisters" interests, member of the Warren Commission, and advisor to nine US presidents.)

The Zinsser plant attracted Hungarians, Poles, Hungarians, Czechs, and Russians who immigrated for work. By the start of World War I the Zinsser's plant had grown to 30 buildings. In 1917, the U.S. government established a mustard gas factory on the property - the production was at capacity of 75 tons of mustard gas per day by the time the armistice was signed. During the war, 200 National Guardsmen were stationed in Hastings because of the security interest of the chemical plants. At the same time Zinsser also served as a colonel in the US Army as assistant to William Walker, commander of the Chemical Warfare Service's Edgewood Arsenal in Baltimore, Maryland, where the army operated a mustard gas plant.

After the war, Zinsser took over the vacated government arsenal buildings, resumed and expanded the dye production. The plant was sold to Harshaw Chemical Company in 1955.

Zinsser Park, in northwestern Hastings between Broadway and the Old Croton Aqueduct, is named for him.

Bibliography 
 James S Ketchum M D: Chemical Warfare Secrets Almost Forgotten. WestBow Press, 2012,.
 Walter Isaacson and Evan Thomas: The Wise Men: Six Friends and the World They Made New York: Simon & Schuster, 1997;

References

1868 births
1956 deaths
American manufacturing businesspeople
People in the chemical industry
20th-century American chemists
Businesspeople from New York (state)
People from Hastings-on-Hudson, New York
World War I crimes by the United States
19th-century American chemists